Nonna Bella was a Turkish singer of Armenian descent, in the 1970s. In the early 1970s, she became famous with her song "Şimdi Sen Varsın Dünyamda".

She was known for her arrangements of foreign songs and Turkish folk songs.

During the 1970s, she retired from singing.

References

External links 
YouTube:
 Çakır Eminem
 Kalenin bedenleri
 Konyalı
 Vur kafanı sağa sola

Year of birth missing (living people)
Turkish women singers
Turkish folk singers
Turkish people of Armenian descent
Living people
Ethnic Armenian women singers